"Hey Ma" is a song recorded by American rapper and singer Pitbull and Colombian singer J Balvin, featuring vocals from fellow Cuban-American singer Camila Cabello, taken from The Fate of the Furious movie soundtrack (2017). It was co-written by the artists, while co-produced by Sermstyle, T-Collar, and Pip Kembo. There are two versions of the song; one in Spanish and one in English. Music videos were directed for both versions of the song by American director Gil Green, with the Spanish video premiering on March 10, 2017 and the English video on April 7.

Background
Originally, the song was scheduled to be a collaboration between Pitbull, Britney Spears and Romeo Santos, but Spears and Santos were replaced by Cabello and Balvin, respectively.
However, the first version with Spears and Santos has leaked and it can be found on the internet.

Critical reception
In Billboard, Spotify editors named the song as a "steamy single" and highlighted Cabello's "fitting charm".

Commercial performance
"Hey Ma" debuted at number five on the Hot Latin Songs chart with 14,000 downloads sold, marking Pitbull's highest debut ever on the chart and matching Balvin's previous best, with "Ginza". The song also marks Cabello's first entry on the chart. It was certified Gold by the Recording Industry Association of America (RIAA). As of February 21, 2019, the single, which served as one of The Fate of the Furious theme-songs, surpassed 500,000 certified units sold in the United States. The music video for "Hey Ma" surpassed 300 million views on YouTube, making it 3x VEVO Certified.

Internationally, the song reached the top 10 in Spain, Guatemala, Israel and Bulgaria.

Music video
The music video for "Hey Ma" was directed by Gil Green and shot in Miami. As described by Billboard, the "spicy" video is filled with "bright and vivid" scenes representing the Cuban culture as the trio move around the streets interacting with the crowd and dancing in front of "impressive" cars. Scenes from The Fate of the Furious appear in the music video. As of July 2019, the video has surpassed over 330 million views.

Live performances
Balvin, Cabello and Pitbull performed the first televised performance of the song at the 2017 MTV Movie & TV Awards. Griselda Flores from Billboard magazine said that "The trio heated things up when they took the stage to perform the upbeat track", and praised their looks by saying: "Cabello stepped into a strapless, flower-printed red dress wearing it over black shorts that peeked through the dress' front slit. Pitbull and J Balvin complemented Cabello's look by rocking all-black outfits: Balvin in a casual denim pants and leather jacket combo and Mr. 305 in a fitted suit".

Accolades

Credits and personnel
Credits adapted from the liner notes of The Fate of the Furious: The Album.

Recording
 Camila Cabello's vocals recorded at A Studios (West Hollywood, California)
 Pitbull's vocals recorded at Circle House Studios (Miami, Florida)
 J Balvin's vocals recorded at Artcrime Studios (La Romana, Dominican Republic)
 Mixed at Orange Coyote Studios (Studio City, California)

Management
 Published by Artist Publishing Group West and Made in Harare Publishing Designee admin. by WB Music Corp. (ASCAP), Artist 101 Publishing Group and John Mitchell Publishing Designee admin. by Warner-Tamerlane Publishing Corp. (BMI), Circa 242/Prescription Songs (ASCAP), Sony/ATV Songs LLC/Abuela Y Tia Songs (BMI), Universal Musica Unica Publishing (BMI), Sony/ATV Songs LLC/Milamoon Songs (BMI), Universal Pictures Music (ASCAP), UPG Music Publishing (BMI)
 Pitbull appears courtesy of RCA Records/Mr. 305 Records
 J Balvin appears courtesy of Universal Music Latino
 Camila Cabello appears courtesy of Epic Records, a division of Sony Music Entertainment

Personnel

 Pitbull – lead vocals, songwriting
 J Balvin – lead vocals, songwriting
 Camila Cabello – guest vocals, songwriting
 Sermstyle – songwriting, production, keyboards
 Tinashe "T-Collar" Sibanda;– songwriting, production
 Pip Kembo – songwriting, production
 Johnny Mitchell – songwriting, additional vocals
 David Phung – background vocals
 Edgar Machuca – background vocals
 Rosina "Soaky Siren" Russel – songwriting
 Johnny Yukon – songwriting
 Ryan Gladieux – vocal production
 Andres David Restrepo "Rolo";– vocal production
 Jean Rodríguez – vocal production, engineering
 Daniel Flores – vocal production
 Al Burna – vocal production, engineering
 Matt Beckley – vocal production, engineering
 James Royo – mixing
 Raphael Bautista – assistant mixing
 Todd Norman – assistant mixing

Charts

Weekly charts

Year-end charts

Certifications

References

2017 songs
2017 singles
Pitbull (rapper) songs
J Balvin songs
Camila Cabello songs
Spanish-language songs
Latin pop songs
Reggaeton songs
Songs written by Pitbull (rapper)
Songs written by J Balvin
Songs written by Camila Cabello
Songs written by Tinashe Sibanda
Songs written for films
Fast & Furious music
Songs written by Sermstyle